Ideain, the cyanidin 3-O-galactoside, is an anthocyanin, a type of plant pigment.

Natural occurrences 
Ideain is the main anthocyanin in red-skinned or red-fleshed (for example Weirouge) apple varieties. It is also found in Chinese hawthorn fruits (Crataegus spp.). It is also the pigment in the copper beech (cultivar of Fagus sylvatica), that was identified in 1932.

While it is only one in the many anthocyanins present in bilberries (Vaccinium myrtillus) and cranberries (Vaccinium macrocarpon), it is the main anthocyanin in lingonberries (Vaccinium vitis-idaea).

Quintinia serrata, the tawheowheo, a species of evergreen trees endemic to New Zealand, has different patterns of anthocyanins (cyanidin 3-O-glucoside and cyanidin 3-O-galactoside) in its leaves to protect the shade-adapted chloroplasts from direct sun light.

References

External links 
 Ideain chloride at extrasynthese.com
 

Anthocyanins
Flavonoid galactosides